Anthony S. Skoronski (May 23, 1920 – September 5, 1992) was an American jockey in Thoroughbred horse racing. For more than a quarter of a century until retiring in 1969, he rode primarily at racetracks in the Chicago, Illinois area and at Oaklawn Park Race Track in Hot Springs, Arkansas. During his career he won the riding title eight times at Chicago's Sportsman's Park and two at Oaklawn Park.

Skoronski's most important Graded stakes race wins came aboard Challenge Me, a colt he rode to victory in the 1944 Arkansas Derby and the 1945 Hollywood Gold Cup.

In 1992 Tony Skoronski was living in Cicero, Illinois when he suffered a heart attack while at the local racetrack and was  pronounced dead on arrival at hospital. His career was honored with induction in the Chicagoland Sports Hall of Fame.

References
 September 10, 1992  Chicago Sun-Times  obituary for Tony Skoronski
 Chicagoland Sports Hall of Fame

1920 births
1992 deaths
American jockeys